For the 1945–46 season, Carlisle United F.C. competed in the Third Division Northern Section.

Results & fixtures

Third Division Northern Section

Selected results

FA Cup

References

 11v11

External links

Carlisle United F.C. seasons